The Milan International was a world's fair held in Milan in 1906 titled L'Esposizione Internazionale del Sempione, or sometimes The Great Expo of Work. It received 4,012,776 visits and covered 250 acres.

Summary

The fair opened on 28 April 1906, ran until 31 October and marked the opening of the Simplon Tunnel.
The fair was held in Sempione Park and Piazza d'Armi', with the first location hosting fine arts displays and the latter industrial and engineering exhibits, along with the foreign pavilions. Countries contributing included many from Western Europe, China, Japan, Turkey, United States, Canada and several South American countries shared a pavilion.  The venues of the exposition were connected by the temporary Milan Exposition Elevated Railway.

Legacy
The International Commission on Occupational Health was founded at the Milan International and is still active; and the Milan aquarium was built, and is still standing.

References

External links
Official website of the BIE
  (Italian language)

World's fairs in Milan
History of Milan
1906 in Italy
Arts in Italy
20th century in Milan
Tourist attractions in Milan